Lost in Cyco City is the debut studio album by Canadian rock band Sumo Cyco. The album was released independently in Canada on June 10, 2014.

The band has released eight singles and music videos to promote the record.

Track listing
All songs written by Skye Sweetnam and Matt Drake except where noted.

Release history

References

2014 debut albums
Sumo Cyco albums